Elvan is an unincorporated community in Loudoun County, Virginia, United States. Originally known as "Jumbo", Elvan is located on Elvan Road off Mountain Road (VA 690) in northern Loudoun County.

Unincorporated communities in Loudoun County, Virginia